This is a list of useful examples in general topology, a field of mathematics.

 Alexandrov topology
 Cantor space
 Co-kappa topology
 Cocountable topology
 Cofinite topology
 Compact-open topology
 Compactification
 Discrete topology
 Double-pointed cofinite topology
 Extended real number line
 Finite topological space
 Hawaiian earring
 Hilbert cube
 Irrational cable on a torus
 Lakes of Wada
 Long line
 Order topology
 Lexicographical/dictionary order
 Ordinal number topology
 Real line
 Split interval
 Overlapping interval topology
 Moore plane
 Sierpiński space
 Sorgenfrey line
 Sorgenfrey plane
 Space-filling curve
 Topologist's sine curve
 Trivial topology
 Unit interval
 Zariski topology

See also
Counterexamples in Topology
π-Base: An Interactive Encyclopedia of Topological Spaces

General topology examples
 Examples
Examples